Eagles Canyon Raceway is a motor racing track in Decatur, Texas built to FIA specifications.

The track was devised by David and Linda Cook, both with extensive backgrounds in motorsports, who set out to create a Formula 1-style race track in North Texas. They spent over two years locating the ideal land to recreate the feel of European countryside, eventually purchasing  of prairie land near Decatur in January 2006. The rocky hills and valleys of the property give the track  of total elevation change, as a bonus providing good viewing for spectators. 

Ground breaking on Eagles Canyon started in April 2006. In October 2006 a small plane crashed upon take off from the still under construction track. The track was designed by former racing driver Rob Wilson and former Formula One team manager and commentator Peter Windsor, among others. Central Motorcycle Roadracing Association provided design input from a motorcyclist's perspective regarding curbs and the pit lane. The original , 11-turn track opened in November 2007 after a $3.5 million investment. The track has  of elevation changes up and down, evoking the feel of Sonoma Raceway and Laguna Seca. The  back straight and other straightaways terminate into hard braking zones ideal for passing. The track features sweepers, esses, switchbacks, carousels, and double apex turns. A shorter  variant of only the east side of the track has 9 turns. Courses may be run either clockwise or counterclockwise.

In June 2017 David Cook sold Eagles Canyon to Livio Galanti of Autodrome LLC, who quickly began renovating the track and facilities. Construction began in August 2018 to repave the bumpy track and update the layout of the main course. The smaller  track, "Canyon", retained the same shape. A proposed , 6-turn layout named "Little Italy" consisting of the track's west loop would be made possible by paving a new crossover; however,  this remains incomplete.

The facility also contains a clubhouse, classrooms, and garages for members.

The track provides the local car and motorcycle community a safe place to drive or ride fast through its membership, performance driving days, and SCCA's Track Night in America. Racing series held here include SCCA and NASA events, 24 Hours of Lemons, LATAM Challenge Series, and CMRA series.

References

External links 
 

Buildings and structures in Wise County, Texas
Motorsport venues in Texas